Phellodon tenuis is a species of tooth fungus in the family Bankeraceae. Found in Brazil, it was described as new to science in 1988 by Richard Baird.

References

External links

Fungi described in 1988
Fungi of South America
Inedible fungi
tenuis